Nordovka is a rural locality (a selo) and the administrative centre of Nordovsky Selsoviet, Meleuzovsky District, Bashkortostan, Russia. The population was 1,000 as of 2010. There are 9 streets.

Geography 
Nordovka is located 54 km northwest of Meleuz (the district's administrative centre) by road. Mustafino is the nearest rural locality.

References 

Rural localities in Meleuzovsky District